Edward Lewknor may refer to:

Edward Lewknor (died 1556) (1516–1556), MP for Horsham
Edward Lewknor (died 1605) (1542–1605), son of above, MP for Tamworth, New Shoreham, Maldon and Newport, Cornwall
Edward Lewknor (died 1618) (1587–1618), son of above, MP for West Looe